Histon railway station is a disused railway station in Impington, Cambridgeshire on the Cambridge–St Ives branch of the Great Eastern Railway. The station was closed as part of the Beeching Axe in 1970; but the line through the station remained open for freight trains until the early 1992. The station site was partially demolished, with the platforms and a small building on the down side being removed and the canopy severely truncated during the construction of the Cambridgeshire Guided Busway but the station building was saved from being demolished; a car park was planned to be built on the site of the demolished station building. The building has operated as a cafe since 2021.

Gallery

References and notes

External links
 Histon station on navigable 1946 O. S. map
 Photos of The Cambridge to St Ives Line

 

Disused railway stations in Cambridgeshire
Former Great Eastern Railway stations
Railway stations in Great Britain opened in 1847
Railway stations in Great Britain closed in 1970
Beeching closures in England
1847 establishments in England